DeMario DeWayne White Jr. (born September 22, 1991), known professionally as Moneybagg Yo, is an American rapper from Memphis, Tennessee. Known for his melodic blend of trap, drill, and Southern hip hop music, he has gained recognition for his lyrics that are characterized by their sharpness, a delivery that is often described as mellow, and themes that delve into introspection; he's become frequently lauded as one of the leading voices in contemporary hip hop. 

White is signed to Collective Music Group, a record label founded by fellow Memphis rapper Yo Gotti, in a joint venture with Interscope Records. Throughout his career, White has released several critically acclaimed albums and mixtapes, including Federal 3X (2017) and 2 Heartless (2018), both of which debuted in the top 20 of the Billboard 200 chart at No. 5 and No. 16 respectively. His third album, Time Served, which was released in January 2020, debuted at number 3 on the Billboard 200, while his fourth album, A Gangsta's Pain, became his first chart-topping project upon its release in April 2021.

White has won multiple awards, including the 2021 Trapper of the Year award and the Best Rapper of the Decade award by Complex.
Furthermore, he has also been nominated for various awards from organizations such as the American Music Awards, Grammy Awards, Hollywood Music in Media Awards, and iHeartRadio Music Awards.

Early life 
Moneybagg Yo, whose real name is Demario DeWayne White Jr, was born on September 3, 1991 in Memphis, Tennessee to a single mother. He is the oldest of three siblings and was raised in South Memphis. According to Moneybagg Yo, he had a difficult childhood where his mother served the role of both parents and they often struggled with financial issues, including not having lights, furniture or running water at times.

Despite his mother's best efforts to provide for her children and keep them safe, the struggles at home and strict rules she imposed would often lead Moneybagg to run away from home and seek refuge with friends or on the streets from a young age. 

Demario attended Mitchell High School in the city which is where he earned his stage name "Moneybagg Yo" as a tribute to his "hustler's mentality". This mindset is all about "getting to the bag", which is a reference to the money he's trying to make. He later dropped out in the 12th grade, describing himself as "terrible" during that time. Additionally, he explained that he felt that staying in school wasn't providing him with any financial benefits and saw no future in it. He was also influenced by the fact that he was seeing his mother struggle to provide for him and his siblings, including having to sleep in an apartment with no furniture. Thus, he chose to leave school to pursue other opportunities and provide for his family.

Despite trying to focus on sports like basketball and football, and even getting a job at a chicken restaurant, Moneybagg's struggle to provide for his family, led to him turning to selling drugs in order to make ends meet. This was further compounded by the fact that he had his first child at this time. Despite his mother's efforts to keep him away from the streets, the young and hungry Moneybagg was driven to do whatever it takes to provide for his family.

In spite of dropping out of school, Moneybagg Yo had the determination and street-wise acumen to make a way for himself. He began to focus on entrepreneurial pursuits and diligent efforts to make a living, often spending significant time in the Haravan community where he became involved in drugs and violence. This lifestyle put him in dangerous situations and even led to him nearly losing his life. However, according to him, his determination to make a better life for himself and his family kept him going.

It was during this period of his life that Demario began to develop a passion for music. He was inspired by the financial success that some of his peers were able to achieve through rapping, earning as much as $20,000 per performance. This made him realize that he too had the potential to make a significant income through music. He began to take the art form seriously and started to hone his skills as a rapper, writing lyrics and practicing his flow. Eventually, he began to gain a following and started to build a name for himself in the local rap scene.

DeWayne grew up in the Walker Homes community, which was known for its high crime rates and gang activity, he has spoken about being exposed to violence and drugs at a young age.

His street life would intersect with his personal life on August 8, 2011, in which during Moneybagg Yo's family annual picnics on August 8, an altercation occurred that resulted in Moneybagg Yo, being shot at. However, he was able to escape unharmed and was later arrested in connection with the incident. It is unclear what exactly led to the altercation or what the specific charges were that Moneybagg Yo faced as a result of the incident.

After the incident at his family picnic, Moneybagg Yo used the traumatic experience as motivation to work harder in his music career. He released his first official song "F U Pay Me" later that year. Despite facing challenges and setbacks, Moneybagg Yo remained determined to succeed and used his experiences to fuel his passion for music.

During his spare time, Moneybagg Yo and his best friend Elo enjoyed freestyling. Elo believed that Moneybagg Yo had the potential to become a successful rapper and encouraged him to pursue a career in music. In 2015, Moneybagg Yo released his mixtape "Federal", which gained popularity in the Memphis and Tennessee areas

Elo was fatally shot in 2015, which prompted Moneybagg Yo to take his rap career more seriously. As a way to honor his best friend, he released a CD titled "ELO" (Everybody Lives On), which became a tribute to Elo. The CD resonated with many in the South and North Memphis areas.

Career 
Growing up in South Memphis, Moneybagg had a love for hip hop music from a young age and was heavily influenced by artists such as Boosie, Yo Gotti, Juvenile, and Future. According to him, he was captivated by everything about their lives and aspirations. "Everything about their life, I just fell in love with," he said in an interview reflecting on his childhood. In an effort to escape the struggles of life in the hood, Moneybagg turned to rapping as a means of making a living.

He began his career in 2011 with the release of his first official single "F U Pay Me". Over the following years, he released several mixtapes, including "Da Block 2 Da Booth" in 2012 and "All Gas No Brakes" in 2016.

In a 2022 interview with the New York Times, Moneybagg spoke about how during the early stages of his career he had to sacrifice important moments in his life and his children's lives such as birthdays, holidays, football games and even simple things like doughnuts with his dad, as he was focused on providing for his children and making a name for himself in the industry.

In 2016, he released two more mixtapes, one of which won a Memphis Hip Hop Award for Mixtape of the Year. Federal Reloaded, a revision of the first installment of the Federal series, featured guest appearances from Y Grizzle, Young Dolph and OG Boo Dirty, among others. The follow-up, ELO (Everybody Lives On), included guest appearances from Yo Gotti and Migos' Quavo, among others. His work with Yo Gotti continued on a joint effort titled 2 Federal, released in October 2016. Heartless arrived in February 2017 and charted at No. 177 on the Billboard 200. The mixtape featured guest appearances from YFN Lucci and Lil Durk. In October 2017, Moneybagg released Federal 3X, his debut with Interscope since signing a distribution deal. The mixtape contains a sole feature from YoungBoy Never Broke Again.

Following the release of his tape with Youngboy, as Moneybagg began to gain broader recognition, he was surprised to learn that many established stars such as Future, were long-time fans of his music. He has been quoted saying to the New York times “A lot of people were really riding, listening to my music, that you wouldn’t expect”.

In 2018, Moneybagg Yo delivered a compilation album: Moneybagg Yo Presents: NLess Ent x Bread Gang. The project was released on January 1, 2018. On February 14, 2018, Moneybagg released his sequel mixtape to 2017's Heartless, 2 Heartless with features from Quavo, Yo Gotti, Lil Baby, and BlocBoy JB and production from Zaytoven and Southside. On July 27, 2018, he released a nine-track mixtape, Bet On Me, with features from YoungBoy Never Broke Again, Lil Baby, and Gunna with the production handled from Tay Keith, Drum God, Javar and others. Moneybagg Yo released his debut studio album Reset in November 2018. He released his second studio album, 43va Heartless, in May 2019. His third studio album, Time Served, was released in January 2020. It includes "All Dat" and "U Played", his first Hot 100-charting singles. The album reached number three on the Billboard 200, with 66,000 units sold during its first week of release. It was followed up by a deluxe edition in May. On June 30, 2020, he released the single "Said Sum", his highest-charting song as a lead artist. 
After Moneybagg Yo and fellow rapper Blac Youngsta both announced they would be releasing their respective solo albums on a shared day of September 18, 2020, the rappers took this to social media two days before to announce they would instead release a collaborative mixtape titled Code Red. Moneybagg Yo also released a remix of "Said Sum", featuring American hip hop group City Girls and American rapper DaBaby, which is included on the mixtape.

Moneybagg released his fourth studio album, A Gangsta's Pain, on April 23, 2021. It features guest appearances from Kaash Paige, Big30, Future, Polo G, Lil Durk, Jhené Aiko, and Pharrell Williams. The album became his first number-one project, debuting with 110,000 units on the Billboard 200, and returned to the top in its third week. On June 1, 2021, Moneybagg released the standalone single, "Rookie of the Year", an ode to basketball player Ja Morant.

In July 2022, Moneybagg performed to tens of thousands of people at London’s Wireless Festival, in what was his first international show “Trap taking over the world now,” he said when speaking the New York Times “It ain’t limited no more.”

Legal issues and controversies

Background 
Moneybagg Yo has had several legal issues throughout his career. He grew up in the hood closely affiliated with gangs, being the cousin of Three 6 Mafia’s Crunchy Black. Growing up, he idolized the "dope boys" and "kingpins" gangs in his neighborhood.

Moneybagg Yo was acquainted with Lance Taylor, also known as OG Boo Dirty, who has a criminal history including an arson charge and two attempted second degree murder charges. In 2010, during Thanksgiving weekend, there was an altercation in the parking lot outside Level II nightclub that left six people shot, the altercation was between rapper Yo Gotti and OG Boo Dirty. According to authorities, Taylor allegedly punched a man who had inserted himself into an ongoing argument between them, which led to shots being fired. Six people were shot, including OG Boo Dirty and an off-duty police officer who was working as security for the nightclub.

OG Boo Dirty and Yo Gotti were both arrested and charged with inciting to riot and aggravated riot. However, the charges were later dropped.

Arrest at CD release party 
In March 2016, Moneybagg Yo was arrested at a CD release party for himself and other local rappers in Tipton County, Tennessee. The party, held at the former Maserati Club on Highway 70 in Mason, was targeted by the Tipton County Sheriff's Office for criminal activity, violence, and probation or parole violators. Moneybagg Yo was arrested on drug and gun charges alongside 27 other people. The Tipton County Sheriff's Office confiscated 10 loaded guns, a bulletproof vest, cash, and drugs.

Some of those arrested were known gang members belonging to the Vice Lords, Gangster Disciples, Bloods, and Crips. Federal authorities were also notified of the presence of three undocumented immigrants at the concert and began an investigation into their immigration status. Charges were later dropped.

Feud with NBA Youngboy and Ralo
In 2017, Moneybagg Yo released a joint mixtape with NBA YoungBoy called "Fed Baby's," but the two later got into a feud and YoungBoy dissed Moneybagg in a video in which Youngboy can be heard saying "Fuck that Tape, Bitch I want smoke". Moneybagg tried to keep the peace and eventually the two seemed to have resolved their differences. However, 1017 Label artist Ralo later got involved, dissing Moneybagg as well as labelmate Blac Youngsta who Moneybagg has a tape “Code Red” with.

Ralo claimed that he only wanted Moneybagg's help in connecting him to Blac Youngsta and Yo Gotti to end their own beef. Moneybagg addressed the situation in an interview on The Breakfast Club and tried to stay clear of the drama, focusing on his music and family.

Signing with CMG

There was controversy when Moneybagg Yo announced that he had signed to CMG (Collective Music Group), a record label owned by Yo Gotti, a rapper from North Memphis. Both rappers are from different parts of Memphis and there is a longstanding conflict between the North and South sides of the city. Moneybagg Yo is from South Memphis, while Yo Gotti is from the North.

Moneybagg Yo first gained attention in the music industry with the release of his mixtape "All Gas No Brakes". This mixtape caught the attention of CMG label boss Yo Gotti, and he made multiple attempts to sign Moneybagg. After building up a solid trust and rapport with Yo Gotti, Moneybagg finally decided to sign on the dotted line with CMG. Yo Gotti reportedly blessed him with a $200,000 signing bonus up front, jumpstarting his career and helping him achieve success in the industry.

Many people were divided on the decision, with some claiming that it was a great move for the rapper's career and others arguing that it was a betrayal to his roots in South Memphis. The controversy was especially fierce between the north and south parts of the city as there is longstanding conflict between those parts which has escalated to dangerous levels, even resulting in the loss of life. Many people in the South accusing Moneybagg Yo of abandoning his roots in favor of chasing fame and success whilst others argued that the rapper had every right to pursue his career and that signing to CMG was a smart move that would help him reach a wider audience.

In a Vlad interview, Moneybagg Yo claimed that people were "hating on him for no reason" and that no one had been killed in the Level II Nightclub shooting, so signing to CMG and getting a record deal shouldn't be an issue. However, it was later revealed that someone had indeed been killed with court affidavits suggesting that  Lance taylor was the triggerman, adding credibility to claims made later by Stupid Duke, a rapper affiliated with Yo Gotti, that Moneybagg was working with the "opps," or rivals of Yo Gotti's crew. OG Boo Dirty, who is also Stupid Duke's blood brother and long-time rival of Yo gotti, had also released a diss track after the shooting called "Get Em G" directed at Yo Gotti, and in the music video, Moneybagg Yo can allegedly be seen supporting OG Boo Dirty.

Feud with Stupid Duke 

In 2020, Moneybagg Yo was involved in a public feud with rapper Stupid Duke. The origins of the feud can be traced back to around 2010, in which there was an altercation in the parking lot outside the Level II nightclub in Memphis, Tennessee that left six people shot.

Among those accused of being involved in the altercation were Yo Gotti and Lance Taylor, also known as OG Boo Dirty, a rival of Yo Gotti and a member of Moneybagg's former crew "Young Mob" with a criminal history including arson and two attempted second degree murder charges. Court affidavits suggest that Lance Taylor was the triggerman.

On April 9, 2020, rapper Stupid Duke claimed in an interview that Moneybagg Yo was working with the police, or "opps," and had turned his back on the streets and his former crew, Young Mob. Receipts even popped up confirming that Moneybagg Yo was indeed a member of Young Mob. Prior to this, it was not widely known that Moneybagg Yo had any connections to Young Mob or any involvement in criminal activity. This revelation led to a series of diss tracks and online attacks targeting Moneybagg Yo and those connected to him.

The claims made by Duke were seemingly supported by the 2010 altercation at the Level II nightclub. The altercation and its connection to Moneybagg Yo's former crew added credibility to Stupid Duke's accusations. The tension between the two rappers and their respective crews continued. Duke and his affiliates  targeted Moneybagg Yo and those connected to his record label, CMG, with diss tracks and online attacks. Moneybagg Yo responded with his own track, "Thinking Out Loud," from his 2020 album Time Served. This prompted another diss track from Duke.

In April 2021, Stupid Duke was released from prison and returned home. With Dukes release it seemed to many that his feud with Moneybagg Yo had died down. Despite their past differences, both parties have not publicly spoken about the other or reignited the feud. Moneybagg has made a point of avoiding unnecessary beefs whenever possible. He has a reputation for keeping his head down and focusing on his music, rather than getting caught up in drama with other artists. This is evident in his 2017 Fued with NBA Youngboy.

Despite the beef, Moneybagg Yo and Stupid Duke have both denied that they are involved in any criminal activity. However, the history of violence and criminal activity within their respective crews has raised suspicions and has led some to question their involvement.

The feud between Moneybagg Yo and Stupid Duke has garnered significant attention from both the rap community and the general public, with many speculating about the true nature of the beef and the potential for it to turn violent. It remains to be seen how the situation will play out, but some say that the rift between the two rappers is deep.

2020 party shooting 

In September 2020, Moneybagg Yo was celebrating his 29th birthday with his crew and girlfriend Ariana Fletcher in Las Vegas, Nevada. During the party, shots rang out and a female, rumored to be a friend of Ariana, was injured. Gunshots were fired outside the location where the group was gathered. The incident was captured on Instagram live, and in the video, voices can be heard saying "They're coming back", before more gunshots are heard. At least one person was reportedly shot and taken to the hospital.

The shooters escaped, and Moneybagg Yo denied that he was the target of the shooting. However, some people have questioned whether he would admit it if he was the target, as this would bring law enforcement attention to him. The incident caused tensions to rise and added to the ongoing feud between Moneybagg Yo and Stupid Duke.

Feud with Father
The feud with Duke took a turn in June 2021, just 2 months after Dukes release from jail, when someone claiming to be Moneybagg Yo's father accused the rapper of selling out and switching up after achieving fame, and shared receipts of Moneybagg Yo with his former associates. This added to the perception that Moneybagg Yo was following the "paper trail," or prioritizing financial gain, over loyalty to his roots and crew.

According to HD White, after his son Moneybagg Yo's career took off, Moneybagg acted like he didn't know his father anymore. In response, HD White released a rap song in which he takes shots at his son and posted it on Facebook, along with a message taking shots at Moneybagg Yo. The message reads, "Before the money when everything was cool Now he don’t know us no More." Moneybagg Yo did not respond to the allegations.

Killing of Young Dolph
On November 17, 2021, Rapper Young Dolph was shot and killed in Memphis, Tennessee. The shooting occurred at Makeda's Cookies, a local bakery, where Dolph had been shopping. The police arrested three suspects in connection with the shooting: Justin Johnson, Cornelius Smith, and Shundale Barnett. Johnson and Smith were charged with first-degree murder, while Barnett was charged with being an accessory to first-degree murder.

The death of Young Dolph sent shockwaves through the hip-hop community, and was met with an outpouring of grief from his fans and fellow musicians. Many of his close associates including Paper Route Empire artist Key Glock, Big 30 and Pooh Shiesty took to social media to express their condolences and remember the rapper's life and career.

Fans of both rappers took social media to express their feelings and pay their respects. However, many Moneybagg Yo fans had expressed disappointment and anger that the rapper has not publicly acknowledged the death of his rival and paid his respects.
Many felt that Moneybagg Yo should've taken the opportunity to put aside their differences and show respect for the late rapper. Some have even gone as far as to call for the rapper to release a tribute track or make a public statement about Young Dolph's death.

After the death of rapper Young Dolph, rumors began circulating that fellow Memphis-based rapper Moneybagg Yo had also been shot. The rumors spread quickly on social media and in local communities, with many people claiming that they had heard the news of his supposed shooting on the Memphis police scanner.

However, these rumors were quickly debunked as false, with no credible sources confirming that Moneybagg Yo had been shot. The rumor originated from a tweet which falsely claimed that Moneybagg Yo had been shot and killed. This tweet was quickly debunked by the rapper himself, who took to social media to set the record straight. He stated that the news of his death was completely false and that he was not involved in any shooting.

Another conspiracy theory also emerged that Moneybagg Yo was involved in the murder. This theory began circulating online after a picture emerged of Moneybagg Yo and the alleged killer together, leading some to believe that the two were associates or that Moneybagg was the killer himself. However, there is no factual evidence to support these claims and the picture could have been taken at any point in time and without any context, it doesn't indicate any involvement in the crime.

These conspiracy theories were primarily spread on social media platforms such as Twitter and Facebook. They stemmed from the rumour that the two rappers had a history of tension and conflict in the past. Some have pointed to a series of tweets from Young Dolph from April 2021 in which he ranted about other Memphis rappers, which some have suggested was directed towards Moneybagg Yo. Additionally, some have cited previous incidents of violence between the two, such as a 2017 incident in which over 100 shots were fired at Young Dolph's SUV.

Killing of Big Nuskie

On January 28, 2022, a shooting occurred at the New Horizon River Apartments in the Whitehaven neighborhood of Memphis, Tennessee. Medics arriving on the scene found a 26-year-old man who had been shot multiple times, and he was pronounced dead immediately. The victim, later identified as Big Nuskie was pronounced dead at the scene by medics.

Big Nuskie, was an American rapper and member Moneybagg's record label Bread Gang. He was best known for his association with label CEO and fellow rapper Moneybagg Yo. On January 28, 2022, Big Nuskie was shot and killed in his hometown of Memphis, Tennessee.

Prior to his death, Big Nuskie had given an interview where he spoke about his childhood in the Whitehaven neighborhood and his time spent in juvenile detention. He had also credited Moneybagg Yo for encouraging him to pursue a career in music.

Following the news of the shooting, Moneybagg Yo tweeted a series of broken heart emojis and posted multiple images in tribute to his fallen associate. Nuskie was also reportedly close with and the cousin of Rapper Big30, who is also signed to Moneybagg Yo. Nuskie was reportedly with Big30 for a show at a local high school before he was killed later that evening. Big30, who is also signed to Bread Gang, posted a tribute to the rapper on his Instagram account, expressing his grief and mourning the loss of his cousin and role model.

There have been speculations that the murder of Big Nuski is connected to the murder of Young Dolph or Moneybagg's fued with Stupid Duke. Many people believe that Nuski's affiliation with Moneybagg Yo and his label Bread Gang may have played a role in his murder, possibly as a result of this ongoing feud. There is no concrete evidence to support these speculations as the police have not yet released any information regarding the possible motives or suspects in the case.

In a 2022 interview with the New York Times, Moneybagg Yo spoke of how he planned to name a plot of land he bought after Nuskie

Personal life
Moneybagg Yo has eight children, four sons and four daughters. He is known for indulging in luxurious items and experiences, not only for himself, but also for his children, often gifting them with high-end jewelry and other expensive items. For example, while spending a day with Rolling Stone reporter Walaa Elsiddig, he was accompanied by two of his sons, Demario and Omarrion, and they visited a jewelry shop where he dropped off several items to be cleaned and gifted each boy with their own diamond bezel Rolex. They also have a personal chef.

Moneybagg has grown into the biggest rap star to emerge from Memphis in generations, self-admittedly making $150,000 per-concert on some occasions and has been involved in several public feuds with other artists. As a result, he has to be mindful of his safety, even when he is in his hometown. Throughout his day with New York times journalist Jon Caramanica, he was accompanied by two large security guards with military training. This is a precautionary measure to ensure his safety and security as he continues to gain fame and success in the music industry.

In February 2022, it was reported that Moneybagg Yo was allegedly relocating outside of his hometown of Memphis. The news came after the death of his friend Nuskie. The passing of Nuskie is thought to have had a significant impact on Moneybagg Yo, leading him to make the decision to relocate. In a 2022 interview with the New York Times, he confirmed that he had relocated to Atlanta to maintain a sense of peace and focus on his future.

Even though Moneybagg now primarily lives in Atlanta, he has stayed connected to his roots in South Memphis and has been actively investing in local businesses such as an alkaline water called Vior. He has also bought a large plot of land in the area in which he plans to name after his late friend, Nuskie, and develop into a community center, dirt bike paths, and paintball course. “This for my neighborhood,” he said also when speaking to the NYT journalist, Caramanica.

DeMario is known for his love of cannabis. He has publicly spoken about his consumption of marijuana since he was a teenager, and has stated that he uses it as a way to relax and create while recording music. He has also spoken about the importance of discipline when consuming cannabis, and how he chooses not to smoke before performances or interviews in order to stay focused.

Relationships 
In 2019, rumors circulated that
Megan Thee Stallion and Moneybagg Yo were dating after collaborating on two songs. In a January 2020 interview, Moneybagg Yo confirmed that the two had a relationship but that they eventually broke up and remained "cool" with each other. However, it was reported that their strong personalities often caused conflicts between them. However, fans speculated that Megan Thee Stallion had dissed Moneybagg Yo In her 2020 single "B.I.T.C.H.", with lyrics that seemed to reference cheating rumors.

Despite this, the two are said to be on civil terms and have moved on to other relationships, with Megan Thee Stallion rumoured to be dating music artist, Pardison Fontaine.

Religion 
In 2018, Moneybagg Yo converted to Islam, taking his Shahada from rapper, Kevin Gates. He prays five times a day with his $8,000 prayer mat and fasts during Ramadan.

Moneybagg Yo described Islam as what made him quit drinking lean, stating in an interview that, "I'm Muslim so I'm disciplined... I'm strong-minded."

Discography 

 Reset (2018)
 43va Heartless (2019)
 Time Served (2020)
 A Gangsta's Pain (2021)

Notes

References

External links 

1991 births
Living people
African-American rappers
African-American male rappers
Gangsta rappers
Rappers from Memphis, Tennessee
Southern hip hop musicians
21st-century American rappers
21st-century American male musicians
Interscope Records artists
Trap musicians
21st-century African-American musicians
American Muslims
African-American Muslims
Songwriters from Tennessee
Converts to Islam
Converts to Islam from Christianity